Przytok  (German: Prittag) is a village in the administrative district of Gmina Zabór, within Zielona Góra County, Lubusz Voivodeship, in western Poland.

The village has a population of 610.

References

Przytok